This is a list of defunct gambling companies.

Defunct gambling companies
  Argent Corporation – company in Las Vegas, Nevada that at one time controlled the Hacienda Hotel/Casino, the Stardust Resort & Casino, the Fremont Hotel and Casino and the Marina Hotel and Casino
  Aztar
  Boomtown, Inc.
  Caesars World – grew to eight casinos and resorts over the years, until going through a series of ownership changes beginning in 1995, and was ultimately absorbed by Park Place Entertainment in 1999
  Casino Magic Corp.
  Chartwell Leisure
  Fairground Gaming
  Fitzgeralds Gaming
  Gold Strike Resorts
  Grand Casinos
  Hollywood Casino Corp.
  Lady Luck Gaming
  Lakes Entertainment
  Leisure and Gaming
  Mandalay Resort Group – in terms of market capitalization, was one of the largest casino operators in the world. Mandalay Resort Group was a hotel-casino operator based in Paradise, Nevada. Its major properties included Mandalay Bay, Luxor, Excalibur and Circus Circus, as well as half of the Monte Carlo
  Mirage Resorts
  MTR Gaming Group
  Park Place Entertainment – Las Vegas Valley, Nevada based business that was the largest owner, operator and developer of casinos throughout the world
  Peninsula Gaming
  Resorts International
  SHFL entertainment
  Sodak Gaming
  SunCruz Casinos – was one of many cruise lines that offered "cruises to nowhere," legally transporting passengers into international waters beyond the reach of federal and state gambling laws
  Trump Hotels & Casino Resorts 
  World Sports Exchange

Defunct poker companies
  Absolute Poker 
  Boss Media 
  Cereus Poker Network 
  CryptoLogic 
  Doyles Room 
  Gutshot Poker Club 
  Mayfair Club 
  Pokerspot 
  UltimateBet 
  UltimatePoker.com

See also

 List of casinos
 List of casino hotels
 Lists of companies

References

 
Gambling